(born 1921) is a Japanese engineer  best known for translating the Kural into Japanese from its English version.

Biography
Shuzo first read a translation of a few couplets of the Kural in the 1970s and developed an interest in reading more of it. He wrote to his pen-friend Shekar in Omalur, Salem, Tamil Nadu, India about his interest, and Shekar's father S. M. Muthu, an avid lover of Tamil literature, sent Shuzo a copy of G. U. Pope's English translation of the Kural. Shuzo soon began translating the entire work into Japanese and completed it in 1980, for which he corresponded with Muthu seeking clarifications about the ancient work in 50-odd letters.

In 1981, his another penpal, C. Thanaraj, arranged for Shuzo's maiden trip to India to attend the fifth World Classical Tamil Conference to be held in Madurai, where Shuzo presented his research essay on the Kural. Upon Muthu's request, Shuzo also translated poet Bharathiar's Kuyil Paatu into Japanese, which won an award and cash prize from the Thanjavur Tamil University. Shuzo also translated Manimekalai, Naaladiyar, Panchathanthira Kathaigal and Voice of Vallalar into Japanese.

Shuzo also authored a book titled My India As Seen Through Letters, explaining his experience with the Indian culture all through the correspondence with Muthu.

Opinions and quotes
Shuzo opines about the Kural text thus:

See also

 Tirukkural translations
 Tirukkural translations into Japanese
 List of translators

References

1921 births
Living people
Tamil–Japanese translators
Tirukkural translators
Translators of the Tirukkural into Japanese